Pickwick, also known as the John Kent Kane Jr. House, is a historic estate home located in West Whiteland Township, Chester County, Pennsylvania. The house was built in 1930 in the Tudor Revival style.  It consists of a -story, T-shaped main block flanked by a -story, kitchen wing and -story garage.  It features half-timbering and projecting -story dormer on the south facade.

It was listed on the National Register of Historic Places in 1988.

References

Houses on the National Register of Historic Places in Pennsylvania
Tudor Revival architecture in Pennsylvania
Houses completed in 1930
Houses in Chester County, Pennsylvania
National Register of Historic Places in Chester County, Pennsylvania